Josef Divíšek (born 24 September 1990) is a professional Czech football player who currently plays for Zbrojovka Brno. He has played for the Czech Republic at junior level.

Divíšek made his Czech First League debut on 21 August 2010 in Příbram's match against Liberec.

References

External links
 
 
 

Czech footballers
1990 births
Living people
Czech First League players
1. FK Příbram players
Footballers from Prague
Association football midfielders
FC Zbrojovka Brno players
FC Silon Táborsko players
1. FC Slovácko players
Czech National Football League players